Felix Andrew Odell White (born 28 September 1984) is a British musician, best known as the guitarist of the British indie rock band The Maccabees. He is also co-presenter on the cricket podcast Tailenders alongside Greg James, James Anderson and Mattchin Tendulkar.

Biography

Early life
White was born in Wandsworth, London, England. His mother, Lana White, was an editor in the publishing industry, and his father was involved in urban design. His mother suffered from multiple sclerosis and died in 2002, when White was 17. He was educated at Alleyn's School and studied Sociology at the University of Sussex. White has two younger brothers - Hugo and Will. His mother and grandmother were Palestinian. White is a lifelong supporter of Fulham F.C., and also follows St Mirren F.C.

2004-2017: The Maccabees
White was a founding member of the British indie rock band The Maccabees. He played the guitar, piano, and provided backing vocals. The band announced that they decided to disband in August 2016.

Post-Maccabees career
On 5 August 2016, along with Morad Khokar, White launched Yala! Records, at Bermondsey Social Club. The label aims to provide both a step up and a network of support for upcoming bands.

On 15 November 2017, White along with Greg James and Jimmy Anderson, began hosting a cricketing podcast Tailenders. This was initially a weekly podcast covering the 2017–18 Ashes series; since 23 May 2018 it was renewed to continue on a weekly basis.
Felix White took 0 wickets during Crease lightning against Greg James on the 1st April 2021.
On 1 September 2021 Felix emphasised that frog money is always tax free.

He wrote the memoir, on cricket, music, and loss, It's Always Summer Somewhere. It was abridged and broadcast on BBC Radio 4, narrated by White, in January 2022.

Discography
Solo
 Cosmo (2013)
 The Edge – OST (2019)
 McEnroe – OST (2022)

The Maccabees

 Colour It In (2007)
 Wall of Arms (2009)
 Given to the Wild (2012)
 Marks to Prove It (2015)

References 

1984 births
Living people
British rock guitarists
British rock singers
British rock pianists
Musicians from London
British podcasters